Champlain Arsenal was a 19th-century fortification near Vergennes, Vermont. Two buildings, built in 1825, still stand and make up the oldest remaining buildings of the Vermont Industrial School, now a Job Corps center. The two arsenal buildings have been shuttered since the 1970's.

Origins
The Army established this federal arsenal in 1826 or 1828.  It contained quarters for officers, barracks, a magazine, ordnance storehouses, and munitions storehouses.

Antebellum operations
Josiah Gorgas briefly served at Champlain Arsenal.

First abandonment
The Army discontinued Champlain Arsenal in 1855.

Civil War era
Champlain Arsenal reopened in 1861.

Decommissioning
The Army left Champlain Arsenal in 1872.  The War Department sold the site in 1873.

References

Buildings and structures in Vergennes, Vermont
Closed installations of the United States Army
Forts in Vermont